The European and African Zone is one of the three zones of regional Davis Cup competition in 2009.

In the European and African Zone there are four different groups in which teams compete against each other to advance to the next group.

Information

Venue: Abidjan, Côte d'Ivoire

Surface: Hard

Dates: 29 April – 3 May

Format

All seven nations will play in a Round Robin. The top four nations will be promoted to the Europe and Africa Group III in 2010.
After Uganda and Gabon withdrew, the format did not change.

Participating teams

 
 
 
 
 
  withdrew
  withdrew

Matches

Ghana vs. Armenia

Côte d'Ivoire vs. Cameroon

Côte d'Ivoire vs. Armenia

Zimbabwe vs. Ghana

Zimbabwe vs. Armenia

Ghana vs. Cameroon

Cameroon vs. Armenia

Côte d'Ivoire vs. Zimbabwe

Zimbabwe vs. Cameroon

Côte d'Ivoire vs. Ghana

External links
Davis Cup draw details

Group IV
Davis Cup Europe/Africa Zone